La Neuveville railway station is a railway station in the municipality of La Neuveville, in the Swiss canton of Bern. It is an intermediate stop on the standard gauge Jura Foot line of Swiss Federal Railways.

Services
The following services stop at La Neuveville:

References

External links 
 
 

Railway stations in the canton of Bern
Swiss Federal Railways stations